The Best Thing (also known as Best Thing) is the name of the third single by the British singer: Adam Rickitt. The single peaked at number 25 on the UK Singles Chart and stayed on the charts for three weeks. The music video of the song was directed by Tim Royes.

Track listing
Single (CD 1)
 "Best Thing (Single Mix)" - 3:24
 "Dreaming" - 3:11
 "I Breathe Again (Blade Radio Mix)" - 4:14
 "Best Thing (Video)" - 3:24

Single (CD 2)
 "Best Thing (Single Mix)"  - 3:23
 "Best Thing (Phats & Small 12" Mix)" - 6:51
 "Best Thing (The Sharp Boys 'N' Adam)" - 7:12

 Vinyl Promo 12"
 "Best Thing (Phats & Small 12" Mix)"
 "Best Thing (Jewels & Stone Extended Mix)"
 "Best Thing (The Sharp Boys 'N' Adam)"
 "Best Thing (Single Mix)"

Charts

References

1999 songs
2000 singles
Songs written by Julian Gingell
Polydor Records singles